5720 may refer to:

In general
 A.D. 5720, a year in the 6th millennium CE
 5720 BCE, a year in the 6th millennium BC
 5720, a number in the 5000 (number) range

Other uses
 5720 Halweaver, a near-Mars asteroid, the 5720th asteroid registered
 Hawaii Route 5720, a state highway

See also